The Foothill Extension is an extension of the Los Angeles Metro Rail L Line light rail line from its former terminus in Pasadena, California, east through the "Foothill Cities" of Los Angeles County. The first stage of the plan, Phase 2A, extended the L Line (then known as the Gold Line) from Pasadena to Azusa; it opened on March 5, 2016. Phase 2B, which will extend the line a further four stations to  Pomona–North, broke ground in December 2017.

The corridor extension forms a part of the Los Angeles Metro Rail system. It is being planned and implemented by Foothill Gold Line.

By the time this project is fully completed, the Regional Connector will have already begun revenue service, at which time the north (Pasadena–Azusa–Pomona) branch of the L Line will be absorbed into the A Line, providing service from Long Beach via Downtown Los Angeles and Pasadena to Pomona.

Route

The entire  route (Phase 2A and 2B) of the Foothill Extension follows the roadbed of the former Atchison, Topeka & Santa Fe Railway's Second Division through the Foothill Cities. These cities are in the foothills south of the San Gabriel Mountains, in the northern San Gabriel and Pomona Valleys. Beginning at the existing L Line station in East Pasadena, the route extends roughly east, ending in Montclair. The route parallels several major roads and highways, including I-210 (Foothill Freeway), Huntington Drive, and Foothill Boulevard.

Planning and Phase 2A
The Foothill Extension was initially conceived as Phase 2 of the Metro L Line (then known as the Gold Line). The route between Los Angeles and Pasadena is considered "Phase 1"; calling the Foothill Extension Phase 2 turned out to be a misnumbering, as the Gold Line Eastside Extension was completed in 2009 between the two phases. The Gold Line Construction Authority (now Foothill Gold Line), which took over the Phase 1 project from Metro in 1999, is also coordinating the Phase 2 projects.

The initial Draft Environmental Impact Report (DEIR) for the Foothill Extension was completed in April 2006 and covered the entire corridor between Sierra Madre Villa station in Pasadena and Montclair. The Final Environmental Impact Report (FEIR) study assessed two different construction options: an LRT Full Build alternative, which would complete the full extension to Montclair, and an LRT Build To Azusa alternative, which would extend only to Azusa; this was dubbed Phase 2A. On February 28, 2007, the Construction Authority Board certified the Final EIR and decided to complete the "LRT Build to Azusa" alternative.

In October 2009, the Metro board unanimously voted to include the Foothill Extension in its long-range plan and approved funding for the construction and operation of Phase 2A. A groundbreaking ceremony for Phase 2A was held on June 26, 2010; construction began the following summer and was completed in September 2015, with the extension entering service on March 5, 2016. The original project budget for Phase 2A was $690 million, including not only construction but also the purchase of vehicles, financing, administrative costs, mitigation, and other costs; in March 2011, the Construction Authority requested a $45 million increase in total budget, to $735 million, to reflect updated cost estimates.

Phase 2B to Montclair
Phase 2B is the project to extend the L Line from the Phase 2A terminus in Azusa east to Montclair. The Final EIR was certified by the Authority Board in March 2013.

Proposed station listing

The alignment will have six new Metro stations: Glendora; San Dimas; La Verne; Pomona, at Pomona (North) Metrolink station with a connection to San Bernardino Line; Claremont, at Claremont Metrolink station with a connection to San Bernardino Line; and Montclair, at Montclair Transcenter with a connection to San Bernardino Line and Foothill Transit Silver Streak.

Foothill Gold Line expects 17,800 riders by 2035.

Status
Planning for the Foothill Extension Phase 2B (Azusa to Montclair) began in 2003, and significant work has been completed for the segment. The Final EIR for the project was certified by the Construction Authority board in March 2013, and advanced conceptual engineering began in 2014. On June 23, 2017, LA Metro's board of directors approved a $1.4 billion budget Thursday to extend the L Line (then the Gold Line) from APU/Citrus College station to Claremont,  to the east. It is expected to cost an additional $70 million to extend the L Line from Claremont to Montclair, across county lines.

Phase 2B of the Foothill Extension is composed of Project 1 and Project 2.  Project 1 is the relocation of freight railroad tracks, which is complete.  Project 2 is the construction of the light rail line itself the L Line utilizes, which started construction in 2022.(more information below)

On December 2, 2017, officials broke ground for Phase 2B in a ceremony at Citrus College. The cost of the project is estimated at $1.5 billion. Completion of Phase 2B (including Montclair Transcenter) is expected by early 2026.

On July 10, 2020, major construction began on Phase 2B, building four stations from Azusa to Pomona, with service estimated to start in 2025. Full construction to Claremont and Montclair by 2028 depends on additional funding to be secured by October 2021.

On September 10, 2021, funding was past due for constructing the route further east of Pomona, pushing the opening date to Montclair back or outright canceling the 3.3-mile segment altogether. 

The first part of the construction, starting in August, focused on reconstructing the 28 at-grade crossings and relocating utilities. Gladstone Street in San Dimas was the first one to begin. Nearly all reconstructions commenced and finished in late 2022, with the final finishing this year. , the At-Grade Crossing reconstruction is over 96% complete. 

The freight/light rail bridges over channels and washes began in 2021, relocating and building new bridges to facilitate the freight and the L Line. These bridges were the first to finish as they didn't impact vehicular traffic. The Light rail bridges, crossing major streets, began briefly. As required by the California Public Utilities Commission (CPUC), the light rail crossing at Foothill Blvd, Route 66, Lone Hill Blvd, and Bonita/Cataract Ave is needed to be grade-separated (light rail only) with a flyover bridge. Those bridges feature the neighborhood's citrus design and will include local artwork. 18 of 19 bridges have been completed.

The more complex component was the freight track relocation. The freight existed in the middle of the ROW, leaving no room for the light rail extension. To create space, the construction authority relocated it to the north side (south side west of Lone Hill Blvd.) of the alignment. It is complete as of October 2022. 

The light rail system was the last to begin (in 2022). Since the freight relocation was completed, the light rail track work and systems are under installation, mainly in Glendora, San Dimas, and La Verne. Systems are already almost 50% complete. The platform construction is also finally underway at all stations, focusing on finishing the deck (of the platform). Like the bridges, stations will also show artwork from locals. Station construction is 18% complete.

, the extension is 63% complete (and on budget).

Proposed phase to Ontario Airport
California State Legislator Chris Holden representing California's 41st State Assembly district proposed a measure in January 2020 that would extend the final phase from Montclair to Ontario International Airport. Measure AB 2011 would form the project's San Bernardino County Rail Construction authority.

References

External links
 Foothill Gold Line – the construction authority overseeing this project.
 Los Angeles County Metropolitan Transportation Authority (Metro) – the county's transportation planning agency.
 Los Angeles Metro Gold Line Foothill Extension: A Photo Essay

.
Los Angeles Metro Rail projects
Proposed railway lines in California
Public transportation in the San Gabriel Valley
Railway lines opened in 2016
Tram and light rail transit systems under construction
2025 in rail transport
2028 in rail transport